The Celestics are a Canadian hip hop duo from Montreal. Formed in 2011, the duo is composed of two brothers, rapper Lou Phelps and producer/DJ Kaytranada. Their debut studio project, titled Massively Massive, was independently released in 2011. The Celestics released their second project, titled Supreme Laziness, on May 20, 2014.

Career

2011–2014: Early beginnings 
The Celestics began as Louie P. & Kaytradamus. They independently released their first project titled Massively Massive via BandCamp in 2011.

2014-present: Supreme Laziness & 001: Experiments 
On May 20, 2014 the duo released their second project titled Supreme Laziness. The project featured guest appearances from GoldLink, Dudley Doo, Nana Zen, Costa Joe & ST

On April 20, 2017, Lou Phelps released his debut solo project titled 001: Experiments – the project was produced entirely by Kaytranada. The project featured guest appearances by Bishop Nehru, Innanet James and Kallitechnis.

Personal life 
Lou Phelps is the younger brother of Kaytranada.

Discography 
 Massively Massive (2011)
 Supreme Laziness (2014)

References 

Black Canadian musical groups
Canadian hip hop groups
Musical groups from Montreal
Sibling musical duos